John Edward Hopcroft (born October 7, 1939) is an American theoretical computer scientist. His textbooks on theory of computation (also known as the Cinderella book) and data structures are regarded as standards in their fields. He is the IBM Professor of Engineering and Applied Mathematics in Computer Science at Cornell University, Co-Director of the Center on Frontiers of Computing Studies at Peking University, and the Director of the John Hopcroft Center for Computer Science at Shanghai Jiao Tong University.

Education
He received his bachelor's degree from Seattle University in 1961. He received his master's degree and Ph.D. from Stanford University in 1962 and 1964, respectively. He worked for three years at Princeton University and since then has been at Cornell University. Hopcroft is the grandson of Jacob Nist, founder of the Seattle-Tacoma Box Company.

Career
In addition to his research work, he is well known for his books on algorithms and formal languages coauthored with Jeffrey Ullman and Alfred Aho, regarded as classic texts in the field.

In 1986 he received the Turing Award (jointly with Robert Tarjan) "for fundamental achievements in the design and analysis of algorithms and data structures." Along with his work with Tarjan on planar graphs he is also known for the Hopcroft–Karp algorithm for finding matchings in bipartite graphs. In 1994 he was inducted as a Fellow of the Association for Computing Machinery. In 2005 he received the Harry H. Goode Memorial Award "for fundamental contributions to the study of algorithms and their applications in information processing."
In 2008 he received the Karl V. Karlstrom Outstanding Educator Award "for his vision of and impact on computer science, including co-authoring field-defining texts on theory and algorithms, which continue to influence students 40 years later, advising PhD students who themselves are now contributing greatly to computer science, and providing influential leadership in computer science research and education at the national and international level."

Hopcroft was elected a member of the National Academy of Engineering in 1989 for fundamental contributions to computer algorithms and for authorship of outstanding computer science textbooks.

In 1992, Hopcroft was nominated to the National Science Board by George H. W. Bush.

In 2005, he was awarded an honorary doctorate by the University of Sydney, in Sydney, Australia. In 2009, he received an honorary doctorate from Saint Petersburg State University of Information Technologies, Mechanics and Optics. In 2017, Shanghai Jiao Tong University launched a John Hopcroft Center for Computer Science. In 2020 the Chinese University of Hong Kong, Shenzhen opened a Hopcroft Institute for Advanced Information Sciences and designated him as an Einstein professor.

Hopcroft is also the co-recipient (with Jeffrey Ullman) of the 2010 IEEE John von Neumann Medal
“for laying the foundations for the fields of automata and language theory and many seminal contributions to theoretical computer science.”

Awards 
 1986. Turing Award
 1989. National Academy of Engineering Member
 1994. ACM Fellow
 2005. Harry H. Goode Memorial Award
 2008. Karl Karlstrom Outstanding Educator Award
 2010. IEEE John von Neumann Medal
 2016. Friendship Award (China)

Selected publications 
 Books
 2017. Foundations of Data Science. (with Avrim Blum and Ravindran Kannan)
 2001. J.E. Hopcroft, Rajeev Motwani, Jeffrey D. Ullman, Introduction to Automata Theory, Languages, and Computation Second Edition. Addison-Wesley.
 1983. Alfred V. Aho, J.E. Hopcroft, Jeffrey D. Ullman, Data Structures and Algorithms, Addison-Wesley Series in Computer Science and Information Processing.
 1974. Alfred V. Aho, J.E. Hopcroft, Jeffrey D. Ullman, The Design and Analysis of Computer Algorithms, Addison-Wesley Series in Computer Science and Information Processing.
 1969. Formal Languages and Their Relation to Automata. (with Jeffrey D. Ullman), Addison-Wesley, Reading MA.

References

External links 
 John E. Hopcroft at Cornell University

American computer scientists
1939 births
Living people
Fellows of the Association for Computing Machinery
Fellows of the Society for Industrial and Applied Mathematics
Members of the United States National Academy of Engineering
Members of the United States National Academy of Sciences
Turing Award laureates
Cornell University faculty
Stanford University alumni
Seattle University alumni
20th-century American engineers
21st-century American engineers
20th-century American scientists
21st-century American scientists
Computer science educators
American textbook writers
American electrical engineers